Mohawk Valley Grange Hall, also known as Union Hall and Moser Hall, is a historic Grange hall located near Grooms Corners, Saratoga County, New York. It was built in 1896, and is a 1 1/2-story, three bay by four bay, timber frame building.  It sits on a dry lad stone foundation and has a steep gable roof. A one-story, shed roofed addition was built in 1934. The Grange purchased the building in 1931, and deeded the building to the Town of Clifton Park in 2004.

It was listed on the National Register of Historic Places in 2012.

References

Grange buildings on the National Register of Historic Places in New York (state)
Victorian architecture in New York (state)
Buildings and structures completed in 1896
Buildings and structures in Saratoga County, New York
National Register of Historic Places in Saratoga County, New York